Asin of Baekje (died 405) (r. 392–405) was the seventeenth king of Baekje, one of the Three Kingdoms of Korea.

Background 
Buyeo Abang was the eldest son of Baekje's 15th ruler Chimnyu, and ascended to the throne after the death of Chimnyu's brother, the 16th king Jinsa, of whom he is said to have killed.

Reign 
During his reign, Goguryeo forces under Gwanggaeto the Great of Goguryeo steadily pushed into Baekje from the north.  Asin appointed his maternal uncle Jin Mu as chief general and ordered him to attack Goguryeo repeatedly in the early 390s, but each attack was defeated.  In 395, after a failed attack by Baekje, Goguryeo took Baekje's territory around today's northern Seoul.

Asin sought to strengthen Baekje's position against Goguryeo, sending his son Jeonji to the Wa kingdom of Japan as a ward to cement Baekje's alliance with that country in 397.  In 398, according to the Samguk Sagi, he constructed Ssanghyeon Castle to protect Baekje's remaining territory north of the Han River.  In 399, during another round of conscription for the battles against Goguryeo, many peasants are said to have fled to Silla. In 403 he attacked Silla.  Historical records do not show any contacts with China during Asin's rule.

Death 
Asin died during the year 405, and watched desperately as his once-powerful kingdom was falling slowly to its powerful northern neighbor Goguryeo. His three brothers would fight for the throne ending in all of their deaths and the crowning of Asin's son.

Family
 Father: Chimnyu of Baekje
 Mother: unknown - of the Jin clan (眞氏).
 Brother: Buyeo Hunhae (扶餘訓解, ?–405) – was in Japan as a hostage where his children stayed and founded the Anko clan (雁高氏). Killed by his younger brother, Seolye, who tried to usurp the throne.
 Brother: Buyeo Seolye (扶餘碟禮, ?–405) – was in Japan as a hostage. Killed his brother Seolye to usurp the throne but was himself killed by his nephew and the prime minister.
 Half-brother: Buyeo Hong (扶餘洪, ?–407) – in 394 was appointed Minister of Internal Affairs (内臣佐平, Naesin-jwa’pyeong).
 Queen: unknown
 1st son: Buyeo Yeong (扶餘映, ?–420) – crown prince 394, sent to Japan 397, 18th King of Baekje, Jeonji of Baekje in 405.
 Daughter: Shinjedo (新齊都媛, ?–?), younger sister of King Jeonji who was sent to Emperor Ojin to wait on him along with 7 maids during the 39th year of Ōjin's reign. She was naturalized in Japan where they called her Shisetsuhime.
 Concubine: unknown
 2nd son: Buyeo Sin (扶餘信, ?–429) – first appointed in February, 407 as Minister of the Interior (Naesin-jwa’pyeong, 内臣佐平) then elected in 408 as chief minister (Sang-jwa'pyeong, 上佐平) which he held through the reign of three kings.

Popular culture 
 Portrayed by Yang Ki Won in the 2007 MBC TV series The Legend.
Portrayed by Park Jung-chul in the 2011–2012 KBS1 TV series Gwanggaeto, The Great Conqueror.
Portrayed by Lee Seung Chan in the 2017 KBS TV series Chronicles of Korea.

See also
History of Korea
List of Monarchs of Korea

References
  Content in this article was copied from Samguk Sagi Scroll 23  at the Shoki Wiki, which is licensed under the Creative Commons Attribution-Share Alike 3.0 (Unported) (CC-BY-SA 3.0) license.

405 deaths
Baekje rulers
4th-century monarchs in Asia
5th-century monarchs in Asia
Year of birth unknown
5th-century Korean people
4th-century Korean people